Lepidoplaga flavicinctalis is a moth in the family Crambidae. It was described by Snellen in 1890. It is found in India (Sikkim) and Sri Lanka.

References

Pyraustinae
Moths described in 1890
Moths of Asia
Moths of Sri Lanka